Oedipina paucidentata, commonly known as the El Empalme worm salamander, is a species of salamander in the family Plethodontidae.
It is endemic to the Cordillera de Talamanca, Costa Rica.

Its natural habitat is tropical moist montane forests.
It is threatened by habitat loss.

References

Oedipina
Amphibians of Costa Rica
Endemic fauna of Costa Rica
Amphibians described in 1968
Taxonomy articles created by Polbot